The Communications Data Bill was intended to create powers to collect data concerning people's phone, e-mail and web-browsing habits for mass surveillance in the United Kingdom. The government database would have included telephone numbers dialed, the websites visited and addresses to which e-mails are sent but not the text of e-mails or recorded telephone conversations.

Since October 2007 telecommunication companies have been required to keep records of phone calls and text messages for twelve months. The bill would have extended the coverage to Internet website visited, email messages, and VOIP data.

Chris Huhne, Liberal Democrat Home affairs spokesman said at the time: "The government's Orwellian plans for a vast database of our private communications are deeply worrying."

The plans were not completed during the Labour administration, but intentions to gain access to more communications data lived on under the coalition elected in 2010 as the Communications Capabilities Development Programme run by the Home Office's Office for Security and Counter-Terrorism. In 2012, a new Draft Communications Data Bill was published.

See also
 Interception Modernisation Programme
 Mass surveillance in the United Kingdom

References

 

Surveillance
Government databases in the United Kingdom
Law enforcement techniques
Counterterrorism in the United Kingdom
Mass surveillance
National security policies
Proposed laws of the United Kingdom
Surveillance databases
2008 in British law
Home Office (United Kingdom)
GCHQ